Grace O'Hanlon (born 10 September 1992) is a New Zealand field hockey player for the New Zealand national team.

She participated at the 2018 Women's Hockey World Cup, and 2020 Women's FIH Pro League.

O'Hanlon formerly played for Auckland in New Zealand. She is openly lesbian.

References

1992 births
Living people
New Zealand female field hockey players
Female field hockey goalkeepers
People from Maryborough, Queensland
Surbiton Hockey Club players
Field hockey players at the 2020 Summer Olympics
Olympic field hockey players of New Zealand
New Zealand LGBT sportspeople
Commonwealth Games gold medallists for New Zealand
Commonwealth Games medallists in field hockey
Field hockey players at the 2018 Commonwealth Games
Field hockey players at the 2022 Commonwealth Games
20th-century New Zealand women
21st-century New Zealand women
Australian people of New Zealand descent
LGBT field hockey players
Medallists at the 2018 Commonwealth Games